Heather Ackroyd and Dan Harvey are British visual artists who have collaborated since 1990 as Ackroyd & Harvey.

Ecology, architecture, sculpture, and photography are some of the disciplines that intersect in Ackroyd & Harvey's work, revealing an intrinsic bias towards process and event. Their artwork makes explicit connections with urban political ecologies by highlighting the temporal nature of processes of growth and decay in sites of architectural and ecological interest as well as contemporary art galleries and museums worldwide. Often working outside the gallery space and in diverse contexts, they are acclaimed for large-scale architectural interventions where they grow landmark buildings with seedling grass.

In 2003, they grew the entire vertical interior space of a disused church in South London; the following year contributed to European Space 9th Sculpture Quadrennial in Riga, Latvia; and in 2007 realised their largest temporary living public artwork FlyTower on the exterior of London's National Theatre. They have received the NESTA Pioneer award and Wellcome Sci-Art award for their work utilizing the light-sensitivity of the pigment chlorophyll in making complex living photographs in grass, and have exhibited this work worldwide including the Andalusian Centre for Contemporary Art, (Seville), Musée de l'Élysée, Lausanne (Switzerland), SF Camerawork, San Francisco (USA), Santa Barbara Museum of Art (California), Exit Art (NY), Isabella Stewart Gardner Museum, Boston (USA), Rice Gallery, Houston (USA) and Big Chill (UK).

Since 2003, they have made a series of expeditions to the High Arctic with Cape Farewell, looking at the effects of climate change on the ecosystem and have shown the resulting work Stranded, a skeleton of a minke whale encrusted with crystals at London's Natural History Museum, the Liverpool Biennial and Japan's Miraikan Museum.

Ackroyd & Harvey have given many lectures and presentations, notably at the London School of Economics, Royal Society, Royal Institute of British Architects, Tate Britain, National Theatre, Manchester International Festival, University of Oxford, Courtauld Institute, Harvard University, San Francisco Institute of Arts and in May 2009 presented at the Nobel Laureate Symposium on Creativity, Leadership and Climate Change at London's Science Museum.

External links
Official site - Ackroyd & Harvey

'Crystal' whale bones go on show, BBC News, 30 May 2006
Ackroyd & Harvey on "the creative response to climate change", Transition Culture, 23 March 2015

Art duos